The San Fernando Valley Historical Society is a private service organization, in Mission Hills, Los Angeles County, California, that is committed to "research, collect and preserve the history, art and culture of the San Fernando Valley".  The group was founded on July 4, 1943.

Activities
The Society offers regular Andres Pico Adobe tours, and special programs and concerts, to educate and entertain the public, listed in an online calendar.

Museum
The San Fernando Valley Historical Society has a Museum about the Valley's history,  housed in the landmark Andres Pico Adobe. The museum offers vintage room settings of the era, antique and artifact displays, and period gardens. The museum is located near the Mission San Fernando Rey de España in Mission Hills, California.

See also
History of the San Fernando Valley to 1915
List of Los Angeles Historic-Cultural Monuments in the San Fernando Valley

External links
official San Fernando Valley Historical Society website
Andres Pico Adobe: history and photos
CSUN: San Fernando Valley History Digital Library website

References

History of the San Fernando Valley
San Fernando Valley
Historical societies in California
Non-profit organizations based in Los Angeles
Museums in Los Angeles
Historical society museums in California
Mission Hills, Los Angeles
Organizations established in 1943
1943 establishments in California